David "Davy" Christie (January 1867 – 1945) was a Scottish footballer who played in the Football League for Stoke.

Career
Christie joined Stoke from Scottish side Forfar Athletic in April 1889. He became a very useful addition to a struggling Stoke side and he helped them claim the Football Alliance title in 1890–91. He had a useful skill of maintaining possession of the ball, which was uncommon in Victorian-era football, and as a result, opponents treated him harshly for it. He served with Stoke for six seasons before leaving the Victoria Ground in 1894 after making 136 appearances scoring three goals.

Career statistics

Honours
with Stoke
Football Alliance champions: 1890–91

References

1867 births
1945 deaths
Scottish footballers
Forfar Athletic F.C. players
Stoke City F.C. players
Dresden United F.C. players
English Football League players
Football Alliance players
Association football midfielders